OVM may refer to:
 Open Verification Methodology, a documented methodology with a supporting building-block library for the verification of semiconductor chip designs
 Option Verdun/Montréal, a municipal political party in Montreal, Quebec, Canada
 OrionVM, an Australian infrastructure as a service provider and white-label cloud platform
 Optimal Velocity Model, a car-following model